Yokotani Choseichii  is a rockfill dam located in Ehime Prefecture in Japan. The dam is used for irrigation. The catchment area of the dam is 4.2 km2. The dam impounds about 6  ha of land when full and can store 502 thousand cubic meters of water. The construction of the dam was started on 1957 and completed in 1967.

References

Dams in Ehime Prefecture
1967 establishments in Japan